Cléophas Bastien (September 1, 1892 – February 10, 1943) was a Canadian provincial politician.

Born in Saint-Gabriel-de-Brandon, Quebec, Bastien was a member of the Legislative Assembly of Quebec for Berthier from 1927 until his death in 1943.

References

1892 births
1943 deaths
People from Lanaudière
Quebec Liberal Party MNAs